The Southern Daly languages are a proposed family of two distantly related Australian aboriginal languages.  They are:

Murrinh-patha (Murinbata)
Ngan’gityemerri (Ngan’gi)

Classification
Southern Daly is a distant and problematic relationship.
Murrinh-Patha was once thought to be an isolate, due to lexical data:  It has, at most, an 11-percent shared vocabulary with any other language against which it has been compared. However, Murrinh-patha and Ngan’gityemerri correspond closely in their verbal inflections. Green (2003) makes a case that the formal correspondences in core morphological sequences of their finite verbs are too similar (in their complexities and their irregularities) to have come about through anything other than a shared genetic legacy from a common parent language.  Nonetheless, lexically they have almost nothing in common, other than cognates in their words for 'thou' (nhinhi and nyinyi) and 'this' (kanhi and kinyi), and it is not clear what could explain this discrepancy.

Vocabulary
The following basic vocabulary items are from Tryon (1968).

{| class="wikitable sortable"
! no. !! gloss !! Tyemeri !! Ngengomeri
|-
| 1 || head || dæpe || dæpe
|-
| 2 || hair || wičæ || wuǰa
|-
| 3 || eyes || dæmoy || damoy
|-
| 4 || nose || dæši || dæče
|-
| 5 || ear || dæčære || dæčære
|-
| 6 || tooth || dædir || dædir
|-
| 7 || tongue || dæčæn || ŋalŋijiak
|-
| 8 || shoulder || tamæmbɛr || dada
|-
| 9 || elbow || mïnmïrpïr || dličiwuwul
|-
| 10 || hand || dæmæ || dæmæ
|-
| 11 || breasts || če || čiye
|-
| 12 || back || dædære || dædære
|-
| 13 || belly || dægæ || damarde
|-
| 14 || navel || dæčɛre || dæčɛre
|-
| 15 || heart || kækulkul || kækulgul
|-
| 16 || urine || waga || waga
|-
| 17 || excrete || ŋækïn || nïkïnmœr
|-
| 18 || thigh || dæbe || dæbe
|-
| 19 || leg || dagare || dagare
|-
| 20 || knee || dænïnǰe || dærɛnǰe
|-
| 21 || foot || dæᵽïr || dæbir
|-
| 22 || skin || agarᵽure || agaraburo
|-
| 23 || fat || aleye || adæwe
|-
| 24 || blood || ᵽæčæn || pučæn
|-
| 25 || bone || ame || ame
|-
| 26 || man || yæde || mipuR
|-
| 27 || woman || ᵽalme || palme
|-
| 28 || father || ŋača || ŋača
|-
| 29 || mother || kala || ala
|-
| 30 || grandmother || mæŋgæ || mæŋgæ
|-
| 31 || policeman || wamumur || wamɔmɔ
|-
| 32 || spear || yawul || yawul
|-
| 33 || woomera || yagama || yagama
|-
| 34 || boomerang || kuɲuŋuɲ || kuɲuŋuɲ
|-
| 35 || nullanulla || magulbe || magulbɔ
|-
| 36 || hair-belt || woyčær || wuǰa
|-
| 37 || canoe || yænïŋgïǰe || kænægïǰe
|-
| 38 || axe || bi || bi
|-
| 39 || dilly bag || waRgaRde || waRguduʔ
|-
| 40 || fire || yæŋge || yæŋge
|-
| 41 || smoke || tawan || dawan
|-
| 42 || water || kure || kurɔ
|-
| 43 || cloud || wɔ || wɔ
|-
| 44 || rainbow || aŋemuŋge || aŋamuŋgi
|-
| 45 || barramundi || ætælmær || awalaŋir
|-
| 46 || sea || kuruŋgur || kuričæwæ
|-
| 47 || river || diRpædær || kuripædæR
|-
| 48 || stone || ᵽæpe || pæpe
|-
| 49 || ground || ŋičir || ŋičïr
|-
| 50 || track || mumba || mumba
|-
| 51 || dust || baᵽun || pabun
|-
| 52 || sun || mire || mïre
|-
| 53 || moon || diwin || diwiɳ
|-
| 54 || star || ŋanimæ || ŋanimær
|-
| 55 || night || kulče nïmbe || ŋaniŋeye
|-
| 56 || tomorrow || ŋuɲananïŋge || wadænige
|-
| 57 || today || dæčaŋe || čawɔrɔ
|-
| 58 || big || kæRæ || yɛrmïnbade
|-
| 59 || possum || awuye || awuye
|-
| 60 || dog || wowo || wowo
|-
| 61 || tail || akïme || dapuR
|-
| 62 || meat || kagɔ || kagɔ
|-
| 63 || snake || æƀæŋgo || abæŋgo
|-
| 64 || red kangaroo || amače || amače
|-
| 65 || porcupine || aŋaneƀiɲe || aŋaneƀiɲi
|-
| 66 || emu || ŋuRp || kɔmɔɛnǰil
|-
| 67 || crow || awaŋge || awak
|-
| 68 || goanna || æmængïɲ || mængiɲ
|-
| 69 || blue tongue lizard || æƀære || æbære
|-
| 70 || mosquito || aƀuŋe || aƀuŋe
|-
| 71 || sugar-bag || pïŋgïlǰa || puŋgudluʔ
|-
| 72 || camp || dædæ || dædær
|-
| 73 || black || čipma || čipma
|-
| 74 || white || bwimaŋgare || boymæm
|-
| 75 || red || ᵽïlᵽïlŋïne || pïlbïlŋïne
|-
| 76 || one || wokumæ || wuŋguwæ
|-
| 77 || two || fagare || wagare
|-
| 78 || when? || æčæ || æčæ
|-
| 79 || what? || čagane || čagane
|-
| 80 || who? || kænæ || kænæ
|-
| 81 || I || ŋaie || ŋaie
|-
| 82 || you || ɲiɲi || ɲiɲi
|-
| 83 || he || næm || næm
|-
| 84 || grass || wurɔ || wuR
|-
| 85 || vegetable food || meye || miye
|-
| 86 || tree || yæwɛR || yawuR
|-
| 87 || leaf || merïŋge || mirïŋge
|-
| 88 || pandanus || yærïge || yærge
|-
| 89 || ironwood || mawuɲ || mawuɲ
|-
| 90 || ripe || mibin || mibin
|-
| 91 || good || yubɔ || yubɔ
|-
| 92 || bad || wulæk || wulæk
|-
| 93 || blind || palakɲim || tarawɔrɔ
|-
| 94 || deaf || ŋamama || waŋamama
|-
| 95 || saliva || čarawɔ || čæræwul
|}

See also 
Daly languages

References 

 
Daly languages
Language families
Proposed language families